Surrender the Pink is a romance novel by actress and author Carrie Fisher that was published in 1990.

This novel, like most of Fisher's books, is semi-autobiographical and fictionalizes events from her real life. It is said to be loosely based on her short marriage to musician Paul Simon.

Plot summary

Surrender the Pink is a story about screenwriter Dinah Kaufman. Although Dinah is successful at her job, she is a failure in her relationships with men. She then meets someone she believes to be the man of her dreams, Rudy Gendler.

Rudy is successful and sophisticated, and he asks her to marry him. She soon discovers, however, that he is not exactly what she believed him to be and their marriage is over. Dinah then realizes that she still loves Rudy and wants him back.

Other Media

In the Season 1 Episode 9 entitled “Riding Backwards” of Mad About You, Helen Hunt’s character Jamie Buckman reads this book on the train.

External links
Carrie's Books at CarrieFisher.com

1990 American novels
American romance novels
American autobiographical novels
Novels by Carrie Fisher
Simon & Schuster books